Alferovskaya is a rural locality (a village) in Zhityovskoye Rural Settlement, Syamzhensky District, Vologda Oblast, Russia. The population was 22 as of 2002.

Geography 
Alferovskaya is located 14 km southwest of Syamzha (the district's administrative centre) by road. Ploskovo is the nearest rural locality.

References 

Rural localities in Syamzhensky District